Nero is a 1922 American-Italian silent historical film directed by J. Gordon Edwards and starring Jacques Grétillat, Sandro Salvini, and Guido Trento. It portrays the life of the Roman Emperor Nero.

Plot
As described in a film magazine, Poppea (Duval) conspires with Tullius (Trento), the emperor's favorite soldier, to have her carried, apparently against her wishes, to Nero's court, where she is sure that she can make him her slave. In return for his part in the plot, Tullius demands to be made governor of Cyprus. Poppea's husband protests in vain, and, refusing to follow Nero's suggestion that he slay himself, joins the legions outside of Rome. The young soldier Horatius (Salvini) while escorting the princess Marcia (Mersereau), a hostage to Nero, to her destination, falls in love with her. He goes to Spain and, when he comes back victorious, Nero (Grétillat) offers him whatever he asks in return for his valor. Horatius asks but for the fair barbarian princess and Nero gives his word. Meanwhile Tullius, ignored by Poppea, plans to usurp her place by bringing Marcia before Nero. Horatius discovers that Marcia has embraced the new religion Christianity and will not consider marrying him unless he converts. When he tries to force his love on her, she cries out for help and Mount Vesuvius erupts, and the ardent soldier falls beneath a pillar. Nero, upon seeing Marcia, desires to withdraw his word, but a storm arises and Haracius carries Marcia to safety. Irked and a prey to ennui, Nero listens to Tullius and permits him to set fire to Rome to inspire Nero's muse. When the people discover what has happened, they cry out against Nero. Poppea suggests that the people be told that the Christians set the fire, and the fickle people believe the lie, saving Nero from their just wrath. The persecutions of the Christians now begins, and Marcia and her slave are among those destined to be fed to the lions. Then the huge servant breaks the lion's jaw. Meanwhile, the legions have revolted against their oppressor and arrive during the exhibition in the arena. Nero flees but, when he cannot escape, commits suicide. Poppea, brutally kicked by Nero, dies in her betrayed husband's arms. Horatius's father Galba (Carotenuto) is proclaimed emperor, and Horatius embraces Christianity for a happy ending.

Cast
 Jacques Grétillat as Nero
 Sandro Salvini as Horatius 
 Guido Trento as Tullius 
 Enzo De Felice as Otho 
 Nerio Bernardi as The Apostle 
 Adolfo Trouché as Hercules
 Nello Carotenuto as Galba  
 Americo De Giorgio as Gracchus 
 Alfredo Galoar as Garth  
 Ernando Cecilia as Roman General  
 Enrico Kant as Roman Captain 
 Paulette Duval as Poppea
 Edy Darclea as Acte  
 Violet Mersereau as Marcia 
 Lina Talba as Julia  
 Lydia Yaguinto as 1st handmaiden 
 Maria Marchiali as 2nd handmaiden

Production

The film was made by an Italian subsidiary of the Fox Film Corporation as part of an ambitious plan to make major films in Europe (with Britain and France planned as destinations as well as Italy). The film was shot on location in and around Rome, including at the Colosseum. Despite the fact that production costs were cheaper in Italy than Hollywood, the film's budget continued to grow. Some differences in labor demands (Italian extras insisting on lap breaks in the afternoons) caused some difficulty for the production as well. The film ultimately cost $358,000 to make. Although the film was eventually able to gross $522,000 this came out as a nearly $60,000 loss due to advertising and distribution costs. The film ended Fox's European scheme after only one production, with an announced film of Mary, Queen of Scots never being made.

Reception
The film received very positive reviews from critics. Variety observed "There are many who will say after viewing Nero that Edwards is the only director with a legitimate claim as a rival of D.W. Griffith.

Preservation status
Nero is now considered a lost film.

See also
List of lost films
1937 Fox vault fire
Nero (2004)

References

Bibliography
 Solomon, Aubrey. The Fox Film Corporation, 1915-1935: A History and Filmography (McFarland, 2011)

External links

1922 films
1920s historical drama films
American historical drama films
American silent feature films
1920s English-language films
1920s Italian-language films
Italian historical drama films
Italian silent feature films
Films directed by J. Gordon Edwards
Depictions of Nero on film
Films set in ancient Rome
Films set in the Roman Empire
Films set in the 1st century
Films shot in Italy
Fox Film films
American black-and-white films
Lost American films
1922 lost films
Lost drama films
Lost Italian films
1922 drama films
1920s multilingual films
1920s American films
Silent American drama films
1920s Italian films